Mikhnevich is a surname. Notable people with the surname include:

 Natallia Mikhnevich (born 1982), Belarusian shotputter 
 Andrei Mikhnevich (born 1976), Belarusian shotputter 

Belarusian-language surnames